Passion Fish is a 1992 American drama film written and directed by John Sayles. The film stars Mary McDonnell, Alfre Woodard, Vondie Curtis-Hall, David Strathairn, Leo Burmester, and Angela Bassett.

It tells the story of a soap opera star, paralyzed after being struck by a taxi, who is forced to return to her family home and rely upon a series of nurses, forcing each of them to leave her employment until one shows up guaranteed to stay.

Plot
May-Alice Culhane, a New York actress on a daytime soap opera, lies in a hospital bed, confused and scared because she is unable to sit up. She attempts to press the call button but ends up switching on the TV, which happens to be playing a scene from the soap featuring her.

Culhane has been left paralyzed after an accident on her way to getting her legs waxed. With no other options, she returns to her family's old and empty home in Louisiana, where she drinks hard, is dissatisfied with every caregiver, and wallows in self-pity.

Her outlook begins to change with the arrival of Chantelle, a nurse with her own problems. The two gradually find a heartfelt connection with each other, and as a result, their lives subtly change.

Cast

Production 
Director John Sayles said his inspiration for the story came from the film Persona, as well as his own experiences working as a hospital orderly. In recovery for a back injury, Sayles was in the queue for X-rays and observed many of the wheelchair-using patients were women accompanied by their nurses. Sayles said, “A lot of them were really bored with each other and not especially nice to each other. And these are people who spend at least eight hours a day together — sometimes 24 — and they may have nothing in common. So I started thinking about that relationship."

Reception

Critical reception 
On Rotten Tomatoes, it has an approval rating of 100% based on reviews from 25 critics.

Critics praised the film for its exploration of relationship dynamics, female friendship, and character detail. Emanuel Levy noted, “Working again in the 'woman’s picture' domain, Sayles showed he could deal with material usually seen in 'TV Movie of the Week' in a mature, non-melodramatic way. Centering on female friendship, Passion Fish coincided with a cycle of studio films about female bonding, such as Thelma and Louise, A League of Their Own, and Fried Green Tomatoes.” Levy continued, "On the surface, the heroines play familiar types, but Sayles again shows his forte in etching deft characterizations, detailing the emotional transformation of each woman and the bond they establish once they get to know one another.”

Roger Ebert of the Chicago Sun-Times gave Passion Fish four out of four stars and wrote, “There are elements here of a vaguely similar relationship in 'Driving Miss Daisy,' but Sayles has his own film, direct and original, and in the struggle of wills between these two characters he creates two of the most interesting human portraits of the year.” Janet Maslin of The New York Times also lauded the film and observed Sayles "refuses to make his characters simple or stupid for the movies."

Praise for the acting was unanimous. Michael Wilmington of the Los Angeles Times wrote, "It’s a critical cliche to talk about Oscar-worthy performances in the flood of year-end candidates, but Woodard and McDonnell deserve a look—from everybody. In the movie, the two show us a developing love and respect that is subterranean, almost unspoken, seeping up beneath a contentious surface. They have the easy, emotion-stretching mastery and limber spontaneity that marks the best screen acting."

Critic Malcolm Johnson of the Hartford Courant also praised the cinematography and setting. He wrote, “as photographed by Roger Deakins, 'Passion Fish' mirrors May-Alice's growing fascination with photographing the reclaimed world of her lost youth, a milieu Mason Daring amplifies with Cajun music. But more than a voyage into the bayous, 'Passion Fish' is a celebration of sisterhood and rebirth, movingly enacted by two of our finest actresses.”

In November 2021, the film was featured as part of The Criterion Channel's series "Between Us Girls: Bonds Between Women".

Box office
Passion Fish received a limited release on December 9, 1992, running for one week, the minimum required to make it eligible for consideration at the next year's Academy Awards. The film earned $36,332 (14,385 of that in the weekend) in the week from showings in two theaters. After receiving Academy Award nominations in February 1993, the film was released to 191 theaters, where it earned over 99% of its gross of $4.8 million.

Awards and nominations

References

External links
 
 
 

1992 films
1992 comedy-drama films
American comedy-drama films
American independent films
Films directed by John Sayles
Films about paraplegics or quadriplegics
Films about alcoholism
Films about actors
Films about nurses
Films set in Louisiana
Films shot in Louisiana
Films scored by Mason Daring
Films with screenplays by John Sayles
1992 independent films
1990s female buddy films
1990s English-language films
1990s American films
Films about disability